This is a list of films produced in China ordered by year of release in the 1960s. For an alphabetical listing of Chinese films see :Category:Chinese films

1960

1961

1962

1963

1964

1965

1968

Mainland Chinese Film Production Totals

See also
Cinema of China
Best 100 Chinese Motion Pictures as chosen by the 24th Hong Kong Film Awards
List of Hong Kong films of the 1960s
List of Taiwanese films

References

Sources
中国影片大典 Encyclopaedia of Chinese Films. 1949.10-1976, 故事片·戏曲片. (2001). Zhong guo ying pian da dian: 1949.10-1976. Beijing: 中国电影出版社 China Movie Publishing House. 
中国艺术影片编目 China Art Film Catalog (1949-1979). (1981) Zhongguo Yi Shu Ying Pian Bian Mu (1949-1979). Beijing: 文化艺术出版社 Culture and Arts Press.

External links
IMDb list of Chinese films

1960s
Films
Lists of 1960s films

zh:中国大陆电影